Fackson Nkandu (born 27 May 1971) is a Zambian long-distance runner who specialized in the 10,000 metres during his career.

He won a bronze medal in this event at the 1994 Commonwealth Games. He also competed in the 1993 World Championships. He is the national record order in the 10 km road, setting his mark in Durban, Republic of South Africa on 16 November 1996. Also a Zambian records in athletics in The 3rd IAAF World Half Marathon Championships was held on 24 September 1994 in Oslo, Norway.

Achievements

References

External links

thecgf

1971 births
Living people
Zambian male long-distance runners
Athletes (track and field) at the 1994 Commonwealth Games
Commonwealth Games bronze medallists for Zambia
Commonwealth Games medallists in athletics
World Athletics Championships athletes for Zambia
Medallists at the 1994 Commonwealth Games